Atlanta Highway could refer to:
 U.S. Route 78 in Athens, Georgia
 Georgia State Route 13 between Buford and Gainesville, Georgia